Hauberg is a type of communal forest management that is typical of the Siegerland and adjacent parts of the Lahn-Dill Uplands and the Westerwald in central Germany. Its aim is to manage the forest in order to produce tanbark and charcoal for the regionally important iron ore industry as well as firewood. In addition to forestry uses, the area also has agricultural uses, such as the growing of rye and buckwheat, typical of shifting cultivation, in the year after the timber harvest, as well as subsequent communal grazing (commons).

Overview 

The Hauberg is an oak-birch coppiced woodland, in which other trees are occasionally scattered. With a cycle of from 16 to 20 years the Hauberg undergoes clearcutting or coppicing, leaving the stumps in the ground to begin growing again. Only in the year after clearfelling is the land used for grain. In years when there is a lot of mast, pigs are kept in the Hauberg.

With the decline in demand for tanbark and charcoal this form of management has lost its significance. In the second half of the 20th century large areas were turned over to high forest management. The remaining low forest stands are almost exclusively devoted to the production of firewood and industrial wood.

See also 
 Haubarg or Hauberg, a typical farmhouse type on the Eiderstedt peninsula

Literature

General sources 
 Becker, Alfred: "Der Siegerländer Hauberg". Vergangenheit, Gegenwart und Zukunft einer Waldwirtschaftsform. verlag die wielandschmiede, Kreuztal, 1991
 Becker, Alfred: Das Haubergs-Lexikon. verlag die wielandschmiede, Kreuztal, 2002
 Hans Hausrath: Geschichte des deutschen Waldbaus. Von seinen Anfängen bis 1850. Schriftenreihe des Instituts für Forstpolitik und Raumordnung der Universität Freiburg. Hochschulverlag, Freiburg im Breisgau, 1982, 
 Richard B. Hilf: Der Wald. Wald und Weidwerk in Geschichte und Gegenwart - Erster Teil [Reprint]. Aula, Wiebelsheim, 2003, 
 Josef Lorsbach: "Hauberge und Hauberggenossenschaften des Siegerlandes". Band X Quellen und Studien des Instituts für Genossenschaftswesen an der Universität Münster. Verlag C.F. Müller, Karlsruhe, 1956. (Dissertation 1953)

Specific sources 
 Konrad Fuchs: Geschichte der Verbandsgemeinde Gebhardshain 1815-1970., Mainz, 1982, 
 Rolf Lerner: Haubergsgenossenschaften im Kreis Altenkirchen., Verlag Mühlsteyn, Elben-Weiselstein 1993
 Manfred Kohl: Die Dynamik der Kulturlandschaft im oberen Lahn-Dillkreis - Wandlungen von Haubergswirtschaft und Ackerbau zu neuen Formen der Landnutzung in der modernen Regionalentwicklung. Gießener Geographische Schriften, Heft 45. 176 pp.(and map material), Gießen, 1978
 Alfred Becker (Red.): Bilder aus dem Hauberg. Naturschutz außerhalb von Schutzgebieten. Schriftenreihe der Landesforstverwaltung Nordrhein-Westfalen, Heft 1. 3., unveränderte Auflage. Forstliche Dokumentationsstelle der Landesforstverwaltung NRW, Arnsberg 2003, 48 pp., 
 Frank Schüssler: Die Haubergswirtschaft: Potenziale und Risiken eines traditionellen forstlichen Betriebssystems. In: Geographische Rundschau 01/2008.

Control aspects 

 Suchanek in Herrmann/Heuer/Raupach, Kommentar zur EStG und KStG, § 3 KStG, Anmerkung 35ff.

External links 
 viele Infos und Fotos, auch zum Forum Niederwald
 Hauberge
 Hauberg online
 
 siegerlaender-hauberg.info
 Faltblatt "Haubergswirtschaft im Siegerland" (PDF-Datei; 501 kB)

Reforestation
Siegerland
Agriculture in Germany